Macrohaltica transversa is a species of flea beetle in the family Chrysomelidae, found in South America.

References

External links

 

Alticini